Thrips is a genus of insect in the order Thysanoptera.

Ecology
Species in the genus Thrips feed on pollen, and can be major agricultural pests, with several being vectors of tospoviruses.

Etymology
The name Thrips comes from the Greek word  meaning woodworm.

Diversity
Thrips is the largest genus of thrips, with over 280 species, most of which are found in Europe, Africa and the Mediterranean Basin. Other species occur on each of the continents, including one species described from Antarctica. Thrips includes the species of thrips most frequently intercepted at ports of entry into the United States, T. tabaci.

The following species are recognised:

Thrips abyssiniae
Thrips acaciae
Thrips addendus
Thrips alatus
Thrips albogilvus
Thrips albopilosus
Thrips aleuritis
Thrips alius
Thrips alliorum
Thrips alni
Thrips alysii
Thrips andrewsi
Thrips angusticeps
Thrips annulata
Thrips annulicornis
Thrips antiaropsidis
Thrips antiquus
Thrips apicatus
Thrips arizonensis
Thrips arorai
Thrips asparagi
Thrips aspera
Thrips aspinus
Thrips assimilis
Thrips atactus
Thrips atratus
Thrips aurantithoracis
Thrips aureolariae
Thrips aureus
Thrips aurulentus
Thrips austellus
Thrips australis
Thrips beharensis
Thrips benseleri
Thrips beta
Thrips bianchii
Thrips biunculatus
Thrips bourbonensis
Thrips brevialatus
Thrips brevicornis
Thrips brevipilosus
Thrips brevisetosus
Thrips brevistylus
Thrips brunneus
Thrips buxi
Thrips calcaratus
Thrips candidus
Thrips cardui
Thrips carthami
Thrips cedri
Thrips cereolus
Thrips cerno
Thrips chandni
Thrips cinchonae
Thrips coloratus
Thrips compressicornis
Thrips conferticornis
Thrips conicus
Thrips conocephali
Thrips coprosmae
Thrips corydali
Thrips corymbiferarum
Thrips crassicornis
Thrips crawfordi
Thrips cynorrhodi
Thrips darwini
Thrips decens
Thrips dentatus
Thrips diana
Thrips difficilis
Thrips dilatatus
Thrips discolor
Thrips disjunctus
Thrips distinctus
Thrips dorax
Thrips dubius
Thrips englerinae
Thrips euphorbiae
Thrips euphorbiicola
Thrips evulgo
Thrips excaeletus
Thrips extensicornis
Thrips facetus
Thrips fallaciosus
Thrips fascicornis
Thrips fedorovi
Thrips femoralis
Thrips flavidulus
Thrips flavus
Thrips floreus
Thrips floricola
Thrips florum
Thrips formosanus
Thrips fraudulentus
Thrips frosti
Thrips fulmeki
Thrips fulvipes
Thrips fumosoides
Thrips fumosus
Thrips funebris
Thrips fuscicornis
Thrips fuscipennis
Thrips gardeniae
Thrips garuda
Thrips gentluteae
Thrips georgicus
Thrips gossypii
Thrips gowdeyi
Thrips gracilis
Thrips gracilis
Thrips gramineae
Thrips griseus
Thrips grossulariae
Thrips hanifahi
Thrips hawaiiensis
Thrips helianthi
Thrips helvolvus
Thrips heraclei
Thrips herricki
Thrips himalayanus
Thrips hispidus
Thrips hoddlei
Thrips hoodi
Thrips idahoensis
Thrips imaginis
Thrips impar
Thrips incognitus
Thrips inferus
Thrips insignis
Thrips intricatus
Thrips iranicus
Thrips italicus
Thrips javanicus
Thrips juniperinus
Thrips kali
Thrips klapaleki
Thrips knoxi
Thrips kodaikanalensis
Thrips konoi
Thrips kotoshoi
Thrips kurahashii
Thrips laevicollis
Thrips latiareus
Thrips latis
Thrips leeuweni
Thrips leptocerus
Thrips levatus
Thrips linariae
Thrips linarius
Thrips lini
Thrips lividus
Thrips lomatus
Thrips longalatus
Thrips longicaudatus
Thrips longiceps
Thrips maculicollis
Thrips madroni
Thrips magnus
Thrips major
Thrips malloti
Thrips mancosetosus
Thrips mareoticus
Thrips martini
Thrips medialis
Thrips mediterraneus
Thrips melastomae
Thrips menyanthidis
Thrips meridionalis
Thrips meruensis
Thrips microchaetus
Thrips minutissimus
Thrips mirus
Thrips modicus
Thrips monotropae
Thrips montanus
Thrips morindae
Thrips mucidus
Thrips nelsoni
Thrips nigropilosus
Thrips novocaledonensis
Thrips obscuratus
Thrips obscuripes
Thrips ochracea
Thrips oneillae
Thrips orientalis
Thrips origani
Thrips oryzophagus
Thrips pallicornis
Thrips pallidicollis
Thrips pallidulus
Thrips pallisetis
Thrips palmerae
Thrips palmi
Thrips paludosus
Thrips palustris
Thrips panousei
Thrips paradoxa
Thrips paramadroni
Thrips parvispinus
Thrips pauciporus
Thrips pavettae
Thrips pectinatus
Thrips pectiniprivus
Thrips pelikani
Thrips pennatus
Thrips persicae
Thrips phormiicola
Thrips physapus
Thrips pillichi
Thrips pini
Thrips pistaciae
Thrips porteri
Thrips poultoni
Thrips praetermissus
Thrips pretiosus
Thrips priesneri
Thrips pruni
Thrips pseudoflavus
Thrips pusillus
Thrips quadridentatus
Thrips quilicii
Thrips quinciensis
Thrips ranunculi
Thrips rapaensis
Thrips reticulatus
Thrips rhabdotus
Thrips robustus
Thrips roepkei
Thrips rostratus
Thrips rufescens
Thrips rugicollis
Thrips safrus
Thrips sambuci
Thrips samoaensis
Thrips schliephakei
Thrips scotti
Thrips sensarmai
Thrips seticollis
Thrips setipennis
Thrips setosus
Thrips sierrensis
Thrips sieversiae
Thrips simplex
Thrips simulator
Thrips sinaiticus
Thrips solari
Thrips speratus
Thrips spinosus
Thrips stannardi
Thrips subnudula
Thrips sukki
Thrips sumatrensis
Thrips sylvanus
Thrips tabaci
Thrips tanicus
Thrips taraxaci
Thrips tarfayensis
Thrips taurus
Thrips tectus
Thrips temperans
Thrips tenebricosus
Thrips tenellus
Thrips thalictri
Thrips timidus
Thrips tomeus
Thrips trehernei
Thrips tripartitus
Thrips tristis
Thrips trybomi
Thrips unispinus
Thrips unonae
Thrips urticae
Thrips vackari
Thrips validus
Thrips variegatus
Thrips varipes
Thrips verbasci
Thrips viminalis
Thrips vitticornis
Thrips vuilleti
Thrips vulgatissimus
Thrips wedeliae
Thrips wellsae
Thrips winnemanae
Thrips xenos

References

Further reading

Thrips genera
Thripidae
Insects of Europe
Taxa named by Carl Linnaeus